Martí Vergés Massa, usually known as "Martín Vergés" (8 March 1934 – 17 February 2021), was a Spanish footballer. He played for FC Barcelona and earned 12 caps for the Spain national football team and was included in their 1962 FIFA World Cup squad. He died nineteen days short of his 87th birthday.

Honours
Barcelona
 Inter-Cities Fairs Cup: 1955–58, 1958–60, 1965–66
 Spanish League: 1958–59, 1959–60
 Spanish Cup: 1956–57, 1958–59, 1962–63

References

External links
 
 National team data 
 
 
 
 

1934 births
2021 deaths
People from Selva
Sportspeople from the Province of Girona
Spanish footballers
Footballers from Catalonia
Association football midfielders
La Liga players
CD Condal players
FC Barcelona players
Spain amateur international footballers
Spain B international footballers
Spain international footballers
1962 FIFA World Cup players
Catalonia international footballers
Place of death missing